The III South American Games (Spanish: Juegos Sudamericanos; Portuguese: Jogos Sul-Americanos) were a multi-sport event held in 1986 in Santiago, Chile, with some events in Concepción and Viña del Mar. The Games were organized by the South American Sports Organization (ODESUR) and were initially awarded to Brazil at its 1982 congress held in Rosario.  However, four months later, Brazil declined the offer.  Therefore, Guayaquil and Quito in Ecuador were chosen, but due to lack of government support the games were finally moved to Santiago, Chile.

An appraisal of the games and detailed medal lists were published
elsewhere,
emphasizing the results of the Argentinian teams. Torch lighter at the Estadio Nacional de Chile
was athlete Omar Aguilar.

Suriname had the first appearance at the games resulting in a total of 11 teams participating.



Medal count 
The medal count for these South American Games is tabulated below. This table is sorted by the number of gold medals earned by each country.  The number of silver medals is taken into consideration next, and then the number of bronze medals.

Sports
Key sports swimming and track cycling were not held at this edition.  On the other hand, medals were awarded in underwater sports (scuba diving) in categories "orientation" and "pursuit" addressing particularly military staff.

 Archery‡
 Athletics
 Bowling*
 Boxing
Cycling
 Road Cycling
 Fencing
 Football†
Gymnastics
 Artistic gymnastics
 Judo
 Rowing
 Sailing
 Underwater sports
 Shooting
 Taekwondo
 Tennis†
 Weightlifting
 Wrestling

Notes

†: Competition reserved to junior representatives (U-20).

‡: Archery is listed in the overview of the competitions held at the 1986 games. However, there are no medals for Archery in the medal lists.

*: Bowling is declared as "exhibition event" in one source.

References

External links 
Santiago 86 ODESUR page

 
South American Games
South
S
S
Multi-sport events in Chile
Sports competitions in Santiago
1980s in Santiago, Chile
November 1986 sports events in South America